The Uraidla Districts Football Club is an Australian rules football club based in the eastern suburbs of Adelaide which was formed in 1997 as a merger between the former Uraidla Football Club and Eastern Rangers Football Club.  The combined club joined the Hills Football League Central Division and currently continue to field teams in both Senior and Junior grades in Division 1 of that league.

A-Grade Premierships 
 Hills Football League Division 1/Central Division (5)
 2005 
 2009 
 2010 
 2011 
 2013

Merger history 
Uraidla Districts was formed in 1987 through the amalgamation of Uraidla and Eastern Rangers.

Uraidla 
The Uraidla Football Club was formed in 1905 and joined the Mount Lofty Football Association in 1921.  One year later they absorbed the Summertown Football Club and in 1938 they shifted to the Hills Football Association.  In 1961, Uraidla joined the Torrens Valley Football Association before becoming an inaugural member of the Hills Football League, playing in the Central Zone.  Following the restructure of the league, Uraidla were placed in Division 1 where they remained until they merged with Division 2 club Eastern Rangers after the 1996 season.

A-Grade Premierships

 Mount Lofty Football Association (3)
 1923 
 1930 
 1931 
 1932 
 Hills Football Association A1 (3)
 1956 
 1958 
 1959 
 Torrens Valley Football Association (1)
 1963 
 Hills Football League Division 1 (4)
 1979 
 1980 
 1989 
 1996

Summertown 
The Summertown Football Club was formed in 1904 and was an inaugural member of the Mount Lofty Football Association in 1921.  In 1922, Summertown was merged with the Uraidla Football Club and continued under the Uraidla name.

Eastern Rangers 
The Eastern Rangers Football Club was formed in 1983 from a merger of the Ashton Football Club and the Lenswood Rangers Football Club.  Eastern Rangers joined the Hills Football League Division 1 competition, dropping to Division 2 in 1994 where they remained until they merged with the Uraidla Football Club in 1997.

A-Grade Premierships

 Hills Football League Division 1 (1)
 1987

Ashton 
The Ashton Football Club was an inaugural member of the Mount Lofty Football Association in 1921 before shifting to the East Torrens Football Association in 1938.  Ashton joined the Hills Football Association in 1949 and returned to the East Torrens Football Association in 1962.  Ashton continued in the Norwood-North Football Association from 1969 until they joined the Hills Football League Division 2 competition in 1972 where they played until they combined with the Lenswood Rangers Football Club in 1983, forming the Eastern Rangers Football Club.

A-Grade Premierships

 Mount Lofty Football Association (2)
 1936 
 1937 
 East Torrens Football Association (2)
 1938 
 1940 Undefeated 
 Hills Football Association A1 (1)
 1949

Lenswood Rangers 
The Lenswood Rangers Football Club was established in 1967 from a merger of the Forest Range Football Club and the Lenswood Football Club and were inaugural members of the Hills Football League Northern Zone competition.  Following the restructure of the league in 1972, Lenswood Rangers were shifted into the Division 4 competition and were promoted to Division 2 in 1974.  In 1983 they merged with the Ashton Football Club to form the Eastern Rangers Football Club.

A-Grade Premierships
 Hills Football League Division 2 (2)
 1978 
 1979

Forest Range 
The Forest Range Football Club was formed in 1902 and joined the Hills Football Association, later shifting to the Mount Lofty Football Association in 1921.  After a short stint in the East Torrens Football Association from 1929 to 1933, Forest Range returned to the Mount Lofty Football Association before going into recess in 1939.  Following World War II, Forest Range reformed and joined the Hills Football Association in 1946 and in 1949 split into two clubs, a smaller Forest Range Football Club and a new Lenswood Football Club, with both teams being relegated to the B-Grade competition.  Forest Range were promoted to A-Grade in 1952, but relegated again in 1955 before returning to the East Torrens Football Association in 1960.  Forest Range and Lenswood reunited in 1967 as the merged Lenswood Rangers Football Club.

A-Grade Premierships
 Hills Football Association A2 (2)
 1949 
 1950

Lenswood 
The Lenswood Football Club was formed in 1949 as a breakaway from the Forest Range Football Club and joined the Hills Football Association B-Grade completion.  In 1954, Lenswood shifted to the Torrens Valley Football Association but were relegated to the A2 competition in 1959.  Lenswood reunited with Forest Range in 1967 as the merged Lenswood Rangers Football Club.

A-Grade Premierships
 Hills Football Association A2 (1)
 1952 
 Torrens Valley Football Association A2 (3)
 1959 
 1960 
 1962

References 

Australian rules football clubs in South Australia
Australian rules football clubs established in 1997
1997 establishments in Australia